B-Sides, also known as Let Go: B-Sides, is a promotional album by Canadian singer-songwriter Avril Lavigne. It was published before her debut studio album Let Go by Arista Records in 2002. The compilation contains demo and original tracks not included on the final Let Go release. The songs were written and produced in 2001 under the management of Nettwerk in Los Angeles by Lavigne, her post manager Clifford Fabri, the production team the Matrix, and songwriter Cliff Magness after Arista sent her to Terry McBride, CEO of Nettwerk, in an attempt to fit her image and attitude with her voice. Though Lavigne would release Let Go through Arista, she continued with Nettwerk for her management.

Different versions and media usage
 The demo version of "I Don't Give" is an explicit version in which Lavigne sings "I don't give a damn / I don't give a shit". The clean version, in which she sings "I don't give it up / I don't give a damn", appears as a B-side on some formats of Lavigne's debut single "Complicated" and on the American Wedding soundtrack.
 "Why" also appears as a B-side on some formats of "Complicated", along with "I Don't Give". It is also included as the only studio track on a live album that comes with the DVD Avril Lavigne: My World.
 "Get Over It" is included as a B-side for some releases of Lavigne's second single, "Sk8er Boi". She sings "Don't turn around, or you will get punched in the face" in the B-Sides version, while in the single version she sings "Don't turn around, I'm sick and I'm tired of your face".
 Lavigne recorded two different songs called "Take Me Away": one on this album, and the other on Under My Skin (2004).
 "Falling Into History" was covered by Brie Larson in 2005.
 "Falling Down" is featured in the soundtrack for the 2002 film Sweet Home Alabama.
 A different version of "Things I'll Never Say" made the tracklist of the final Let Go album.
 Despite the album Let Go being named after the song with the same title, it was not included on that album.
 Remastered versions of "Falling Down", the single version of "Get Over It", the clean version of "I Don't Give", and "Make Up" in addition to an unreleased studio version of "Why" with alternate lyrics were included in the 20th anniversary edition of Let Go.

Track listing
All tracks produced by the Matrix.

References

Avril Lavigne albums
Albums produced by the Matrix (production team)
Nettwerk Records compilation albums
Promotional albums
2001 compilation albums
Demo albums
B-side compilation albums